Ruthie on the Telephone is an American comedy television series that was broadcast on the CBS Television network at 7:55pm ET from August 7 to November 5, 1949.

The show was written by Goodman Ace and sponsored by Phillip Morris cigarettes. Each episode was only five minutes long. Ruthie on the Telephone was preceded by CBS Television News at 7:30pm ET, and by The Sonny Kendis Show at 7:45pm ET.

Synopsis
The series features a young lady, Ruthie (Ruth Gilbert), trying to convince a man, Richard (Phillip Reed) to love her via a telephone call. The series used a split-screen technique to depict the telephone conversation.

Reception
Billboard magazine called the show funny, and complimented the split-screen effect.

See also
1949-50 United States network television schedule

References

External links
 
 Ruthie on the Telephone at TV Acres

1949 American television series debuts
1949 American television series endings
1940s American comedy television series
CBS original programming
Black-and-white American television shows
English-language television shows